The following list shows the sequence of events of the Peninsular War (1807–1814). It includes major battles, smaller actions, uprisings, sieges and other related events that took place during that period.

For ease of reference using modern maps, the provinces/regions given for Spain and Portugal are those that correspond to the 20th century. Events in Portugal and France are specified.

Overview

The Peninsular War was a military conflict for control of the Iberian Peninsula during the Napoleonic Wars, waged between France and the allied powers of Spain, the United Kingdom and Portugal. It started when French and Spanish armies, then allied, occupied Portugal in 1807, and escalated in 1808 when France turned on Spain, its former ally. The war on the peninsula lasted until the Sixth Coalition defeated Napoleon in 1814, and is regarded as one of the first wars of national liberation, and significant for the emergence of large-scale guerrilla warfare. British and Portuguese forces eventually secured Portugal, using it as a safe position from which to launch campaigns against the French army, while both Spanish and Portuguese guerrillas weakened the occupying forces.

The Peninsular War overlaps with what the Spanish-speaking world calls the Guerra de la Independencia Española (Spanish War of Independence), which began with the Dos de Mayo Uprising on 2 May 1808 and ended on 17 April 1814. Although Spain had been in upheaval since at least the Mutiny of Aranjuez (March 1808), May 1808 marks the start of the Spanish War of Independence. The French occupation destroyed the Spanish administration, which fragmented into quarrelling provincial juntas. In 1810, a reconstituted national government, the Cortes of Cádizeffectively a government-in-exilefortified itself in Cádiz but could not raise effective armies because it was besieged by up to 70,000 French troops. Cádiz would go on to hold the distinction of being the only city in continental Europe to survive a siege by Napoleon: thirty-one months—from 5 February 1810 to 25 August 1812. The combined efforts of regular and irregular forces throughout the peninsula prevented Napoleon's marshals from subduing the rebellious Spanish provinces, and the war continued through years of stalemate.

While the initial stages of the Peninsular War were fought on Portuguese soil, most of the war was fought on Spanish soil and, as the French army was pushed further back across the Pyrenees, the final stages of the war were fought on French soil.

List of events

See also
 Peninsular War
 A History of the Peninsular War by Charles Oman (7 volumes)
 List of French generals of the Peninsular War
 List of Spanish generals of the Peninsular War
 List of Portuguese generals of the Peninsular War

Notes

References

19th century in Portugal
19th century in Spain
Conflicts in 1807
Conflicts in 1808
Conflicts in 1809
Conflicts in 1810
Conflicts in 1811
Conflicts in 1812
Conflicts in 1813
Conflicts in 1814
France–Portugal relations
France–Spain relations
France–United Kingdom relations
Guerrilla wars
King's German Legion
Napoleonic Wars
Portugal–Spain relations
Portugal–United Kingdom relations
Wars involving France
Wars involving Portugal
Wars involving Spain
Wars involving the United Kingdom
Wars of independence

Lists of military conflicts